Baheira Airfield is an abandoned military airfield complex in Libya, which is located about 19 Miles (30 km) Southeast of Ajdabiya, Libya.

The facility was built either by the Italian Regia Aeronautica or German Luftwaffe about 1941.   It consisted of two airfields, about 2.5 miles apart.   During World War II, after the Axis defeat in Egypt during the Western Desert Campaign, the facility was abandoned by the retreating Axis forces.

It was later used by the United States Army Air Force during the North African Campaign by the 57th Fighter Group, which flew P-40 Warhawks from the airfield between 3 December 1942 and 3 January 1943.

Today there are no remains of either airfield, the desert has totally reclaimed the facilities.  Their locations can only be determined by German maps of the area.

References

 Maurer, Maurer. Air Force Combat Units of World War II. Maxwell AFB, Alabama: Office of Air Force History, 1983. .

External links

Airfields of the United States Army Air Forces in Libya
World War II airfields in Libya
Airports established in 1941